Elmore Turner Bethel (March 18, 1895 – February, 1954) was a college football player.

Washington & Lee
Bethel was a prominent tackle for the Washington & Lee Generals football team of Washington & Lee University. He was a center on the basketball team.

1917
Bethel was injured in the 63 to 0 loss to Georgia Tech, for years called the south's greatest team.

1919
Bethel was captain of the 1919 team. In his last game, a win over Tulane, he "covered himself with glory as well as mud." He was selected All-Southern.

References

Players of American football from Richmond, Virginia
All-Southern college football players
American football tackles
Washington and Lee Generals football players
1895 births
1954 deaths
People from Goochland, Virginia